Florian Abel (born 14 August 1989 in Oberhausen) is a German footballer who plays for 1. FC Bocholt in Regionalliga West.

Abel made his professional debut for Rot-Weiß Oberhausen during the final round of fixtures of the 2009–10 2. Bundesliga season away to Arminia Bielefeld, as a substitute for Mike Terranova.

References

External links 
 
 Florian Abel on Fupa

1989 births
Living people
Sportspeople from Oberhausen
German footballers
Association football midfielders
2. Bundesliga players
3. Liga players
Rot-Weiß Oberhausen players
Wuppertaler SV players
Alemannia Aachen players
Footballers from North Rhine-Westphalia
21st-century German people